Dukku is a Local Government Area in Gombe State, Nigeria. Its headquarters are in Dukku town. The Gongola River flows through the west and north of the LGA. It has an area of 3,815 km and a population of 207,190 from the 2006 census. The vast majority of the population are Muslims, but there is a Christian minority. The major ethnic group is Fulani with Fulfulde being spoken as a major language alongside Bole while Hausa, Kanuri, and Kare-Kare are also spoken.

The postal code of the area is 760.

The northeasterly line of equal latitude 14°N and longitude 14°E passes through the LGA about 6 km to the southeast of the town of Dukku.

History
The history of Dukku started in the 17th century when Arɗo Sammbo, a leader of Fulani clan and his people with their cattle migrated from Fuuta Jallon in Guinea and settled in the present location. Another oral tradition says that the head of the Fulbe was Arɗo Almoodo or Almuudo.

Before they finally settled in Dukku, being herders, they wandered around in search of pasture for their animals. They first inhabited in a settlement, according to oral tradition called Kamanei. But they didn't last there because of the tyranny of the king of Kamanei who had a randy male child that would go first to every bride on her bridal night. This custom didn't augur well with the Fulani who settled there, especially one of Arɗo Sambo's son, Yero Nanaro who took an oath that he would slay the prince when the latter came to his bride on their first night. And Yero lived to his promise by slaughtering the prince when he came to their bridal night.
 
This incident forced Arɗo Sammbo and his people to spontaneously leave Kamanei on that night and moved further south, nonstop for weeks until they got to a settlement in Bauchi State, where they divided into three, with one following Arɗo Sammbo or Almuudo moving west until they got to a place called Lumpaaso, some few miles away from present Dukku, at the bank of Gongola River, one of the tributaries of River Benue under the territory of a Bolewa Chief of Kalam named Moi Duja.
 
The Chief of Kalam, Moi Duja accorded them great hospitality by allowing them to settle in his territory. But no sooner had they settled in Lumpaaso than they realised that the place was not conducive for them with their animals as it was very close to the river which makes it difficult for cattle grazing. Thus they complained to the chief who in turned ordered one of his palace sentinels, Madaki Dishe, to show them a better and more convenient place in his territory, which is the present settlement of Dukku.
 
The name Dukku is a Fulfulde word. The town name was initially Dukku ƴori, a combination of Fulfulde word, Dukku (a command word for erecting a pole to which a cow is tethered) and Bolewa word, ƴori (it is okay), but later shortened to Dukku for convenience.
 
The town is the headquarters of Dukku Emirate created out of Gombe Emirate by the first civilian governor of Gombe State, Alhaji Abubakar Habu Hashidu in 2001

List of Laamɓe Dukku
Dukku has had seventeen laamɓe [fulani leaders] (singular: laamɗo), traditional rulers:
 Sammbo Geno ɓii Arɗo Abdu
 Demmbo Dugge ɓii Idrisa
 Muhammadu Gaaɓɗo ɓii Geno
 Gorki ɓii Demmbo
 Muhammadu Bello ɓii Gaaɓɗo
 Yakubu ɓii Gaaɓɗo
 Adamu ɓii Gorki
 Adamu Dagaari ɓii Gaaɓɗo
 Usmanu ɓii Gaaɓɗo II
 Jibir ɓii Gorki
 Sulaimanu Ankwai ɓii Gaaɓɗo
 Adamu ɓii Sulaimanu
 Sammbo Ñaande ɓii Jibir
 Haruna Rashidu ɓii Yakubu I
 Usmanu ɓii Tafida Baaba II
 Abdulkadir Haruna Rashid
 Alhaji Haruna Abdulkadiri Rashid  II

Alhaji Haruna Abdulkadiri Rashid II
Alhaji Haruna Abdulkadiri Rashid II is the current 17th Laamɗo Dukku and the 2nd Emir of Dukku. He has preceded his father Alhaji Abdulkadiri Haruna Rashid, the 15th Laamɗo Dukku and the first Emir of Dukku who died on 24 December 2012

He was born on November 24, 1960, and was named after his grandfather, and the 13th Laamɗo Dukku Haruna Rashid ɓii Yakubu I, son of Laamɗo Yakubu ɓii Gaaɓɗo, son of Gaaɓɗo ɓii Geno, son of the first Laamɗo Sammbo Geno ɓii Arɗo Abdu.
 
He started his education early in the traditional Qur’anic school system before enrolling into Dukku Central Primary School between 1967 and 1972 where he had his primary education. He also had his secondary school education in Government Secondary School, Misau as part of the pioneer students between 1973 and 1977.
He started his working career in the former Bauchi State Civil Service as an Assistant Secretary, where he served for only two months and later joined the then University of Sokoto, now Usman Danfodio University Sokoto as a Graduate Assistant in the Department of Economics, serving for eight (8) years in the institution as an academic staff from 1982 to 1990 where he transferred his services to the Central Bank of Nigeria (CBN) in 1990 starting from Lagos as Assistant Bank Examiner rising to the exalted position of Deputy Director and Branch Controller, Kano branch.
 
Before his ascension to the throne on January 4, 2013, he held the prestigious title of Sardauna Dukku since July 25, 1986. Former Governor Alhaji Ibrahim Hassan Dankwambo presented him with a Staff of Office in a widely attended coronation held in Dukku on November 3, 2008.
 
He is currently the Pro-Chancellor and Chairman Governing Council of the Gombe State University, Gombe.

Wards in Dukku 
There are three district areas in the Local Government, namely: Dukku, Hashidu, and Gombe Abba. And overall there are eleven (11) wards in the LGA:

 Gombe Abba
 Hashidu
 Jamari
 Kunde
 Lafiya
 Malala
 Waziri North
 Waziri South / Central
 Wuro Tale
 Zange
 Zaune

References

Local Government Areas in Gombe State